VPHOP or the Osteoporotic Virtual Physiological Human is a European osteoporosis research project within the framework of the Virtual Physiological Human initiative.

Osteoporotic fractures
With current technology osteoporotic fractures can be predicted with an accuracy of less than 60-70% which is almost equivalent to tossing a coin (probability of 50%). Better ways to prevent and diagnose osteoporotic fractures are needed.

Fracture predictions
Current fracture predictions are based on history and examination on the basis of which key factors are identified which contribute to the increased probability of an osteoporotic fracture. This approach oversimplifies the mechanisms leading to an osteoporotic fracture and fail to take into account numerous hierarchical factors which are unique to the individual. These factors range from cell-level to body-level functions. Musculoskeletal anatomy and neuromotor control define the daily loading spectrum, including paraphysiological overloading events. Fracture events occur at the organ level and are influenced by the elasticity and geometry of bone elasticity and geometry are determined by tissue morphology. Cell activity changes tissue morphology and composition over time. Constituents of the extracellular matrix are the prime determinants of tissue strength. Accuracy could be dramatically improved if a more deterministic approach was used that accounts for those factors and their variation between individuals.

See also
 Physiome
 Physiology
 EuroPhysiome
 Cytome
 Human anatomy
 Living Human Project

References

External links
 VPHOP - The Osteoporotic Virtual Physiological Human
 Europhysiome Action 
 VPH NoE

Physiology